Marietjie Venter is professor in the Department of Medical Virology at the University of Pretoria, where she also heads the Zoonotic Arbo and Respiratory Virus, Centre for Viral Zoonoses. She advises the South African Department of Health and is a chair of World Health Organization's Scientific Advisory Group for Origins of Novel Pathogens.

References

External links

South African virologists
Year of birth missing (living people)
Living people